Strategic Studies Group (SSG) is an Australian software development company that makes primarily strategy wargames.

The company was founded by strategy game enthusiasts Ian Trout and Roger Keating. Trout was proprietor of a military books store and Keating had had several of his games published by Strategic Simulations Inc. The game that launched the company was Reach for the Stars (1983). This games is credited for having "effectively launched the genre of 4-X space games - explore, expand, exploit, exterminate". Its success was followed by a string of other, mostly historical military games published throughout the 1980s for Apple II, Atari, Commodore 64, and IBM PC series of computers.

Titles included Reach for the Stars, Battlefront, Battles in Normandy, Halls of Montezuma: A Battle History of the U.S. Marine Corps, Europe Ablaze, MacArthur's War: Battles for Korea, Carriers at War, (in three volumes), Rommel, Gold of the Americas, and Decisive Battles of the American Civil War (in three volumes, with the first being Bull Run to Chancellorsville).  Several of these titles were also released for 16-bit platforms including the Amiga, Atari ST, Apple IIGS and Macintosh during the late 1980s.

From the outset SSG titles were characterised by a challenging level of intelligence (AI) in the computer opponents provided in the games. Many of the games included scenario editors. For a time SSG published a tie-in magazine, Run 5, that included articles on historical background to the games, game design, game play and data for setting up new or variant scenarios. Subscribers received a disk with the scenario files already created. Published mostly quarterly it ran for 25 issues.

In 1989 SSG published Fire King an action role-playing game developed by Micro Forte, another Australian games developer.

SSG also produced the Warlords series of fantasy turn-based games.  In a mutually friendly decision in 2003, Warlords designer Steve Fawkner broke away from Strategic Studies Group and started Infinite Interactive to publish further Warlords games.

Co-founder Ian Trout died of cancer on 3 August 2011, which left Roger Keating as CEO of the company.

On 19 and 20 June 2014 Roger Keating and Gregor Whiley of SSG attended the Born Digital and Cultural Heritage Conference in Melbourne.  Two academic papers were presented at the conference, outlining the contribution of SSG to video gaming history in Australia. Helen Stuckey examined the contribution of the Run 5 magazine to the gaming community, while Dr Fiona Chatteur outlined the development of computer graphics through the lens of Strategic Studies Group.

List of games developed

References

External links

Strategic Studies Group at MobyGames

Video game companies of Australia
Video game development companies
Video game publishers